The 2019–20 Cymru South was the inaugural season of the Cymru South, which is in the second level of the Welsh football pyramid.

The league consisted of sixteen teams with the champions promoted to the Cymru Premier and the bottom three teams relegated to a regional division of FAW League One.

The season commenced on 16 August 2019 and had been scheduled to conclude on 4 April 2020.

After the season was cut short by the Coronavirus-19 pandemic the FAW confirmed its promotion and relegation decision on 16 June 2020. 

Haverfordwest County were promoted to the Cymru Premier despite finishing second, after league winners Swansea University failed to achieve a Tier One license. STM Sports were relegated despite finishing 6th, after failing to achieve a Tier Two license. Cwmamman United and Caerau (Ely) were also relegated.

Teams 
The inaugural season consisted of twelve teams from the now defunct Welsh Football League Division One, which are Afan Lido, Ammanford, Briton Ferry Llansawel, Cambrian & Clydach Vale B.G.C., Cwmamman United, Cwmbran Celtic, Goytre United, Haverfordwest County, Llantwit Major, Pontypridd Town, Taff's Well and Undy Athletic.

Joining them were Llanelli Town who were relegated from Cymru Premier and Welsh Football League Division Two champions, STM Sports together with runners-up, Swansea University and Caerau (Ely).

Grounds and locations

League table

Positions by round 
The table lists the positions of teams after completion of each round.

Results

Top scorers

Final League table 
On 19 May 2020, the league was cancelled due to the COVID-19 pandemic and an unweighted points per game method was applied to determine the final standings. The  Football Association of Wales said a decision on promotion and relegation between leagues would be made in due course.

Swansea University were declared champions but they failed to secure a Tier One licence for the 2020–21 season after an unsuccessful appeal and not be eligible for promotion. Second placed Haverfordwest County were granted a Tier One licence.

References

2019–20 in Welsh football
Cymru South seasons